The 53rd Separate Mechanized Brigade named after Volodymyr Monomakh is a brigade of the Ukrainian Ground Forces. The brigade is subordinated to Operational Command East. It is deployed in Sievierodonetsk and Lysychansk.

History 
In 2014, the brigade was formed in the village of Nova Lyubomyrka in Rivne Oblast. The brigade includes units formed from territorial defense battalions. The brigade also includes units derived from elements of the 17th Guards Tank Brigade and the 24th Mechanized Brigade. The brigade includes three mechanized battalions, a tank battalion, artillery, two battalion tactical groups, air defense, intelligence company. The brigade's 4th Separate Mechanized Infantry Battalion is the former 14th Cherkasy Territorial Defense Battalion of the 24th Mechanized Brigade. The brigade's 5th Separate Mechanized Infantry Battalion is also a battalion formerly of the 24th Mechanized Brigade.

In February 2015, the brigade fought in the war in Donbas. On 25 May 2015, the brigade repulsed a separatist attack. In September, the brigade was deployed in Avdiivka.

On July 23, 2016, Ukrainian Minister of Defence Stepan Poltorak announced the Deputy Commander of the brigade has been demoted and dismissed for selling arms and ammunition.

From April to October 2017, the brigade units held positions on the Svitlodar Arc. At the beginning of November 2017, the units of the brigades were withdrawn from the ATO area to rest and restoration of combat capacity to landfill in the village of Cherkasy Dnipropetrovsk region.

In 2019, units of the brigade were deployed near Horlivka.

On October 29, 2019, the brigade units left the war zone for rotation. During this time, the brigade had lost 7 soldiers in combat.

On May 6, 2020, the President of Ukraine gave the brigade an honorary name in honor of Volodymyr Monomakh.

Structure 
As of 2017 the brigade's structure is as follows:

 53rd Mechanized Brigade, Sievierodonetsk
 Headquarters & Headquarters Company
 1st Mechanized Battalion
 2nd Mechanized Battalion
 3rd Mechanized Battalion
 24th Motorized Infantry Battalion "Aidar"
 Tank Battalion
 Brigade Artillery Group
 Headquarters & Target Acquisition Battery
 Self-propelled Artillery Battalion (2S3 Akatsiya)
 Self-propelled Artillery Battalion (2S1 Gvozdika)
 Rocket Artillery Battalion (BM-21 Grad)
 Anti-tank Artillery Battalion (MT-12 Rapira)
 Anti-Aircraft Missile Artillery Battalion
 Engineer Battalion
 Maintenance Battalion
 Logistic Battalion
 Reconnaissance Company
 Sniper Company
 Electronic Warfare Company
 Signal Company
 Radar Company
 CBRN-defense Company
 Medical Company

References 

Military units and formations established in 2014
Mechanised infantry brigades of Ukraine
Military units and formations of Ukraine in the war in Donbas